Detective Chinatown 2 is a 2018 Chinese comedy-mystery buddy film directed and written by Chen Sicheng, starring Wang Baoqiang and Liu Haoran. A sequel to 2015's Detective Chinatown, the film was released in China on 16 February 2018. It has grossed over US$544 million worldwide, making it the fifth-highest-grossing film of all time in China.

A sequel, Detective Chinatown 3, was released in February 2021.

Plot
Qin Feng (Liu Haoran) thought he was going to attend his distant uncle Tang Ren's (Wang Baoqiang) wedding, which turned out to be a hoax. Tang Ren had deceived Qin Feng to come to New York for another purpose.

The godfather of Chinatown, Uncle Qi (Kenneth Tsang), gathered the world's best detectives from an app called Crimaster (which allows real detectives to upload their cases for the online community to solve them) and sets up a competition to locate his grandson's killer within one week for a reward of five million dollars. His grandson Jason was found in a temple with his heart torn out and an unknown symbol on a table near him.

Unexpectedly, Qin Feng, the world's second-top detective and the world's third-top detective noticed another similar murder in the Hudson River one week before the investigation began. A white woman was also killed but lost her kidney. The two men pulled out surveillance videos of the two crime scenes and found that a man appeared at both crime scenes. They identify the man as Song Yi (Xiao Yang). However, after observing that Song Yi is right-handed, Qin Feng concludes that he could not be the killer since evidence suggests that the killer is left-handed. While Qin Feng and Tang Ren knew that Song Yi was not the killer, this was not everyone else's consensus, and so the duo had to clear Song Yi's name and find the real killer.

Eventually, with the help of Tang Ren's knowledge of Feng shui and Wu Xing, Qin Feng discovered the killer's motive. Due to the unique location of the murders, the time of the crimes, the eight characters of the victims' birthdays and the organs, he concluded the whole of New York was being used as an altar.(the elements fire, water, wood, metal, and earth were used to determine the locations, date, and the respective organ to be removed)

Finally, they find out that the doctor who was battling cancer believed that doing ancient Taoist rituals could grant him immortality, and was behind the murders. The doctor kills himself after being found out.

Qin Feng deduces that Song Yi is actually the mysterious man "Q", the top-ranked detective of Crimaster. Song Yi solved the case very early on and used the doctor's patterns to cover up his own murder of a sex trafficking ringleader who abducted his sister. Qin Feng lets him go, but later KIKO reveals that "Q"'s IP address does not locate him in America, making Song Yi as "Q" unlikely. "Q" is therefore still at large.

Cast
 Wang Baoqiang as Tang Ren, Qin Feng's distant uncle and a Thai-Chinese swindler who comes to New York to solve a real case.
 Liu Haoran as Qin Feng, Tang Ren's nephew and one of the best detectives of the world. He's the world's second-top detective in the ranking of Crimaster (a app which allows real detectives to upload their cases for the online community to solve them).
 Xiao Yang as Song Yi, a man who is the main suspect of the murder of Uncle Qi's nephew and one of the suspects of being the Q, the top-ranked detective of Crimaster.
 Natasha Liu Bordizzo as Officer Chen Ying, a Chinese-American NYPD detective and Tang Ren's love interest.
 Shang Yuxian as KIKO, a hacker from Hong Kong who specializes in solving cases by hacking the police database and stealing them and the #5 of Crimaster. Her nickname is "Ultimate Computer Hacker" and she is Qin Feng's love interest.
 Brett Azar as Wild Bull Billy, a tough detective from United States and a veteran from U.S. Army. He's the #9 of Crimaster and is notorious for using extreme violence and brute force to solve crimes.
 Bai Ling as Aaimali Kunana, a crazy psychic detective from Indonesia and the #7 of Crimaster. She is famous for using psychic and supernatural skills to solve cases.
Benja Kay Thomas as Detective Charlene the Church Lady! She is famous for her Kung Fu skills.

 Wang Xun as Lu Guofu
 Yang Jinci as Malian (Horse-like face)
 Yuen Wah as Mou Jau-kin
 Satoshi Tsumabuki as Hiroshi Noda (Chinese: 野田宏/Nihongo: 野田浩, Noda Hiroshi), the top detective from Japan and the #3 of Crimaster. He is considered the main rival of the protagonist Qin Feng, due to his almost perfect investigative skills, which displeases Qin Feng.
 Michael Pitt as Dr. James Springfield
 Kenneth Tsang as Qishu (Uncle Qi), the Godfather of Chinatown and the dragonhead of the local Chinese mafia.

Production 
Filming lasted for 40 days in New York City.

Reception

Box office
Detective Chinatown 2 earned $541.1 million in China, and $3 million in other countries, for a worldwide total of $544.1 million.

Critical response
On Metacritic, which assigns a normalized rating, the film has a weighted average score of 48 out of 100, based on five critics, indicating "mixed or average reviews". Users on the Chinese site Douban gave the film an average rating of 6.7/10, while those at Tianjin Maoyan Culture Media gave it a 9.0 rating.

Awards and nominations

References

External links
 
 
 

2010s buddy comedy films
2010s comedy mystery films
Chinese comedy mystery films
Chinese detective films
Films directed by Chen Sicheng
Films scored by Nathan Wang
Chinese sequel films
Wuzhou Film Distribution films
Wanda Pictures films
Films set in New York City
2018 comedy films
2010s Mandarin-language films